KarXT is an investigational oral dual-drug fixed-dose combination of xanomeline and trospium. It is undergoing a phase 3 clinical trial for the treatment of schizophrenia. Xanomeline is a functionally preferring muscarinic M4 and M1 receptor agonist that readily passes into the central nervous system (CNS) to stimulate these receptors in key areas of the brain. Trospium is a non-selective muscarinic antagonist that does not cross into the CNS and reduces peripheral cholinergic side effects associated with xanomeline.

Mechanism of action

Preclinical data supports the hypothesis that xanomeline’s central mechanism of action is mediated primarily through stimulation of brain muscarinic M4 and M1 receptors. M4 muscarinic receptors are most highly expressed in the midbrain, which controls motor and action planning, decision-making, motivation, reinforcement, and reward perception. M1 muscarinic receptors are most highly expressed in the cerebral cortical regions, which regulate higher-level processes including language, memory, reasoning, thought, learning, decision-making, emotion, intelligence, and personality. Unlike direct dopamine D2 and serotonin 5HT2A blocking antipsychotic medications, M4 and M1 receptor stimulation indirectly rebalances dopaminergic and glutamatergic circuits involved in the symptoms associated with neurological and neuropsychiatric diseases such as schizophrenia and Alzheimer’s disease. Based on preclinical pharmacological and genetic studies, M4 receptors appear to modulate both psychosis and cognitive symptom domains and M1 predominantly modulates cognitive symptom domains and modestly regulates psychosis symptom domains.

History

Xanomeline was first synthesized in a collaboration between pharmaceutical firms Eli Lilly and Novo-Nordisk with the goal of delaying cognitive decline in patients with Alzheimer’s disease. In a phase 2 study, significant improvements in cognition were observed in Alzheimer’s patients along with surprising improvements in psychotic symptoms. In a follow-up placebo-controlled study in patients with treatment resistant schizophrenia, similar antipsychotic activity was observed with xanomeline. However, cholinergic-mediated side effects prevented advancement of xanomeline into phase 3 trials. Xanomeline was licensed to Karuna Therapeutics in 2012 and KarXT was subsequently created as a dual drug formulation by adding trospium. Trospium is a non-brain-penetrant and non-selective muscarinic receptor blocker that may ameliorate the peripheral side effects of xanomeline. In a 2021 placebo controlled phase 2 clinical trial, KarXT met the primary endpoint.

References

Muscarinic agonists
Combination drugs